Pablo Arangüena Fernández (born 9 March 1973) is a Spanish politician. He was a member of the Congress of Deputies between 2019 and 2020.

He has sat in the Parliament of Galicia since 2020.

See also 

 13th Congress of Deputies
 14th Congress of Deputies

References 

1973 births
Living people
Spanish Socialist Workers' Party politicians
Members of the 13th Congress of Deputies (Spain)
Members of the 14th Congress of Deputies (Spain)
21st-century Spanish politicians
Members of the 10th Parliament of Galicia